The fireboat Joseph Medill was commissioned in Chicago, Illinois, in 1908, and was the first of two Chicago fireboats of that name—the second being commissioned in 1949.
When she was commissioned she joined five other fireboats.

According to Fire Strikes the Chicago Stock Yards the Joseph Medill and Graeme Stewart were built in the same yard in Manitowoc, at the same time, and were "twins".

In 1963 crewmember Thomas McKnight was knocked overboard during a celebratory display of her water cannons.
Other crew members didn't notice, and McKnight drowned.

See also
 Fireboats of Chicago

References 

Fireboats of Chicago